Avizo (pronounce: ‘a-VEE-zo’) is a general-purpose commercial software application for scientific and industrial data visualization and analysis.

Avizo is developed by Thermo Fisher Scientific and was originally designed and developed by the Visualization and Data Analysis Group at Zuse Institute Berlin (ZIB) under the name Amira. Avizo was commercially released in November 2007. For the history of its development, see the Wikipedia article about Amira.

Overview 

Avizo is a software application which enables users to perform interactive visualization and computation on 3D data sets.   
The Avizo interface is modelled on the visual programming.  Users manipulate data and module components, organized in an interactive graph representation (called Pool), or in a Tree view. Data and modules can be interactively connected together, and controlled with several parameters, creating a visual processing network whose output is displayed in a 3D viewer.

With this interface, complex data can be interactively explored and analyzed by applying a controlled sequence of computation and display processes resulting in a meaningful visual representation and associated derived data.

Application areas
Avizo has been designed to support different types of applications and workflows from 2D and 3D image data processing to simulations.
It is a versatile and customizable visualization tool used in many fields:
Scientific visualization
Materials Research
Tomography,  Microscopy, etc.
Nondestructive testing, Industrial Inspection, and Visual Inspection
Computer-aided Engineering and simulation data post-processing
Porous medium analysis
Civil Engineering
Seismic Exploration, Reservoir Engineering, Microseismic Monitoring, Borehole Imaging
 Geology, Digital Rock Physics (DRP), Earth Sciences
Archaeology
 Food technology and agricultural science
 Physics, Chemistry
Climatology, Oceanography, Environmental Studies 
Astrophysics

Features
Data import: 
2D and 3D image stack and volume data: from microscopes (electron, optical), X-ray tomography (CT, micro-/nano-CT, synchrotron), neutron tomography and other acquisition devices (MRI, radiography, GPR)
 Geometric models (such as point sets, line sets, surfaces, grids)
 Numerical simulation data  (such as Computational fluid dynamics or Finite element analysis data)
 Molecular data
Time series and animations 
 Seismic data
Well logs
4D Multivariate Climate Models 
 
2D/3D data visualization: 
Volume rendering
Digital Volume Correlation
Visualization of sections, through various slicing and clipping methods 
Isosurface rendering
Polygonal meshes
 Scalar fields, Vector fields, Tensor representations, Flow visualization (Illuminated Streamlines, Stream Ribbons) 

Image processing:
2D/3D Alignment of image slices, Image registration
Image filtering
Mathematical Morphology (erode, dilate, open, close, tophat)
Watershed Transform, Distance Transform
Image segmentation
3D models reconstruction: 
Polygonal surface generation from segmented objects
Generation of tetrahedral grids
Surface reconstruction from point clouds
Skeletonization (reconstruction of dendritic, porous or fracture network)
Surface model simplification

Quantification and analysis:
Measurements and statistics
Analysis spreadsheet and charting

Material properties computation, based on 3D images:
 Absolute permeability
 Thermal conductivity
 Molecular diffusivity
 Electrical resistivity/formation factor

3D image-based meshing for CFD and FEA:
 From 3D imaging modalities (CT, micro-CT, MRI, etc.) 
 Surface and volume meshes generation 
 Export to FEA and CFD solvers for simulation
 Post-processing for simulation analysis

Presentation, automation:
MovieMaker, Multiscreen, Video wall, collaboration, and VR support
TCL Scripting, C++ extension API

Avizo is based on Open Inventor 3D graphics toolkits (FEI Visualization Sciences Group).

External links

Scientific Publications
Official Avizo forum
Avizo videos

References 

3D graphics software
3D imaging
Computational fluid dynamics
Computer vision software
Data visualization software
Earth sciences graphics software
Graphics software
Image processing software
Image segmentation
Mesh generators
Molecular dynamics software
Molecular modelling software
Nondestructive testing
Physics software
Science software
Simulation software
Software that uses Qt
Virtual reality